Louis Alexis Desmichels, born in Digne March 15, 1779, died in Paris in 1845, was a French soldier, an ordinary soldier of the French Revolution became general under the July Monarchy, known for his role in the conquest of Algeria and relations with Abd el-Kader (Treaty of 1834).

Biography

The Revolution and the Empire 

Soldier in the 13th Hussars in the Year II (1793–1794), he cut in Year IV (1795–1796) in the company of guides Horse of the Italian army, and then made the campaign Egypt in 1799 and it became brigadier.

Back in France with Napoleon Bonaparte, he was appointed sergeant, stands at the Battle of Marengo and between as a second lieutenant in the cavalry of the guard of the consuls.

At the battle of Ulm, became lieutenant, he surprises to Nuremberg Austrian rearguard, and, at the head of 30 hunters, is to lay down arms and 300 infantrymen. After this first success, it melts with his platoon on a large battalion, and takes the enemy 400 men and 2 flags. At the sound of the shooting, dragons Tower came load the victors; but they are soon put in place and drop 25 pieces of cannon, a military chest and 150 prisoners. After this action, Lieutenant Desmichels was appointed captain of the Legion of Honour, and some time later, colonel of the 31st cavalry.

It also stands in 1813 during the Italian campaign and during the campaign of France in 1814.

During the Hundred Days, he commanded in Belgium as Colonel of the 4th regiment of cavalry.

Restoration 

Dismissed November 25, 1815, it is called into activity in 1821 and promoted to colonel of the Ardennes hunters Regiment (3rd hunters).

Field Marshal July 30, 1823, he commanded the 2nd division of the 7th military division (Drôme).

The July Monarchy

After the July Revolution of 1830, Louis-Philippe gave him the Finistere department, and in 1832, a brigade of cavalry around Weissembourg.

Governor Oran 

Sent in 1833 in Algeria, he was appointed commander of French troops from Oran. Since the occupation of the city, the Garabats, tribes inhabiting the Sig valley 50 km from Oran, have been fighting against the French presence, decided to subdue the General Desmichels directed against them (8 May) 2000 men of all arms, and removes four of their camps. 300 Arabs were killed, destroyed douars, women, children, prisoners, abducted herds.

Also in May 1833, 10 000 Arabs under the command of Emir Abd el-Kader, of which 9000 riders come to camp three leagues Oran: General Desmichels thrown in front of the foundations of a bastion, intended to cover not yet completed fortifications. 27, Arab columns attacking the bastion and the city. After a fierce battle, Abd el-Kader should break camp after losing 800 men, only French with two dead and 30 wounded.

On 5 June, General Desmichels seizes the bridge Arzew, whose occupation is to facilitate the attack of the city of Mostaganem, still held by Turkish soldiers of the former Regency of Alger1.

On July 27, at the head of his division, he joined Mostaganem and strengthens it. Attacked by the Kabyle [ref. required], it repels with energy and makes them incur massive losses. At the same time, Colonel Pond won a victory over the Zmélias. Attacked by the return enraged Arabs, the CEF is saved by the General Desmichels rushed to his aid.

The treaty with Abd el-Kader (1834)

This section is empty, insufficiently detailed or incomplete. Your help is welcome !

As a reward for his conduct, Desmichels was promoted to lieutenant general (General Division) December 31, 1833.

After returning from an expedition against the Smalas, February 4, 1834, after beating Abd El-Kader, he signed with him a treaty under which France recognizes the authority of the emir of Oran in return the recognition of the French presence in the coastal towns.

This treaty, concluded in suspicious forms (the French text does not match the text in Arabic, much more advantageous for the Emir), Desmichels suffered some discredit. In February 18352, it is removed from office and replaced by General Trezel.

Later career 
In 1838 he was called to the command of the 17th military division (Corsica).He then became  part of  the cavalry committee.

References 

1779 births
1845 deaths
French generals
People from Digne-les-Bains